Shaker Asad (born August 18, 1979) is a Palestinian former soccer midfielder who spent three seasons in Major League Soccer and one in the USL First Division.  He also played for the Palestinian national team.

Club career

Early career
Asad was born in the Gaza Strip, and grew up in Raleigh, North Carolina where he attended Athens Drive High School. Asad was First Team All-ACC at N.C. State in 1999, when he led the Wolfpack with 19 points.

Professional
The New England Revolution of Major League Soccer (MLS) picked Asad in the third round (31st overall) in the 2000 MLS SuperDraft.  He saw minimal time in 2000 as the Revs loaned him to the MLS Project-40 team.  In 2001, Asad played in nineteen games before being traded on August 15, 2001, along with Johnny Torres, to the Miami Fusion in exchange for Leo Cullen.  He played only one game with the Fusion, which folded at the end of the season.  On January 11, 2002, the Revolution drafted Asad for a second time, this time in the third round (22nd overall) of the 2002 MLS dispersal draft.  He played in only six games with the Revolution, which loaned him to the Charleston Battery of the USL First Division.  In August 2002, he was injured while playing on loan to the Kansas City Wizards in an exhibition game with the Rochester Raging Rhinos.  The Revs waived him on November 4, 2002, and Asad moved to the Atlanta Silverbacks of the USL for the 2003 season. He is not recorded as playing after that.

International
From 2002, Asad played several years with the Palestinian national team.  His first game was a 1–1 tie with Jordan on February 16, 2002, and his last recorded game was a 2–1 loss to Iraq on June 19, 2004.

External links

References

1979 births
Living people
Atlanta Silverbacks players
Charleston Battery players
Expatriate soccer players in the United States
Association football midfielders
Major League Soccer players
Miami Fusion players
NC State Wolfpack men's soccer players
New England Revolution players
Palestinian expatriate footballers
Palestinian expatriate sportspeople in the United States
Palestinian footballers
People from Gaza City
A-League (1995–2004) players
MLS Pro-40 players
New England Revolution draft picks
Athens Drive High School alumni
Palestine international footballers